Matthew Douglas (born 26 November 1976 in London) is a retired British track and field athlete who specialised in the 400 metres hurdles. He represented Great Britain at two consecutive Summer Olympics starting in 2000. At the Commonwealth Games he first represented Northern Ireland, then later competed for England.

His personal best in the event is 48.54 seconds, set in 2003. As things stand it currently makes Douglas the 4th fastest Briton of all time over this distance.

Douglas suffered from several injury problems towards the end of his career which forced him into early retirement.  He then dedicated his time to taking over his family's solicitor practice.

He has a degree in Sports Sciences from Brunel University London.

Competition record

References

1976 births
Living people
Athletes from London
Male hurdlers from Northern Ireland
English male hurdlers
Olympic athletes of Great Britain
Athletes (track and field) at the 2000 Summer Olympics
Athletes (track and field) at the 2004 Summer Olympics
Commonwealth Games competitors for England
Commonwealth Games competitors for Northern Ireland
Athletes (track and field) at the 1998 Commonwealth Games
Athletes (track and field) at the 2002 Commonwealth Games
Athletes (track and field) at the 2006 Commonwealth Games
Universiade medalists in athletics (track and field)
Alumni of Brunel University London
Universiade silver medalists for Great Britain
Medalists at the 2003 Summer Universiade